Bordonia is a genus of beetles in the family Buprestidae, containing the following species:

 Bordonia descarpentriesi Cobos, 1980
 Bordonia venezolana Cobos, 1980

References

Buprestidae genera